Evelyn Stevens may refer to:
 Evelyn Stevens (cyclist)
 Evelyn Stevens (wrestler)
 Evelyn Paniagua Stevens, American scholar of Latin American studies